Everett Kent (November 15, 1888 – October 13, 1963) was an American lawyer and Democratic member of the U.S. House of Representatives from Pennsylvania.

Early life and career
Everett Kent was born in East Bangor, Pennsylvania in the Lehigh Valley region of the state. He attended the public schools in Lansford, East Bangor, Nazareth, and Bangor. He was engaged as a machinist and as a newspaper reporter, taught school, and worked as the principal of Roosevelt School in Bangor, Pennsylvania.

He graduated from the law department of the University of Pennsylvania in Philadelphia in 1911 and was admitted to the bar the same year. He commenced practice in Bangor and served as counsel for several municipalities and for the board of prison inspectors of Northampton County, Pennsylvania from 1912 to 1915. He served as the solicitor of Northampton County from 1920 to 1923.

Political career
Kent was elected as a Democrat to the Sixty-eighth Congress, but was an unsuccessful candidate for reelection in 1924.

He was again elected to the Seventieth, but was an unsuccessful candidate for reelection in 1928. He was a delegate to the Democratic National Conventions in 1936, 1940, 1944, 1948, 1952, and 1956. He served as solicitor for the county controller of Northampton County from 1933 to 1943.

Later career and death
He resumed the practice of his profession in Bangor, and died in Bethlehem, Pennsylvania at age 74. He was interred in St. John's Cemetery in Bangor, Pennsylvania.

Sources

Everett Kent at The Political Graveyard

1888 births
1963 deaths
20th-century American politicians
Democratic Party members of the United States House of Representatives from Pennsylvania
Politicians from Northampton County, Pennsylvania
University of Pennsylvania Law School alumni